The 1222 Brescia earthquake occurred on Christmas Day in the year 1222. The chronicler Salimbene de Adam records that it was so powerful that the inhabitants of Brescia left their city en masse and camped outside, so that the falling buildings would not crush them.

References

13th-century earthquakes
1222 in Europe
Earthquakes in Italy